Haojiang District is a district of Shantou, Guangdong province, People's Republic of China. It was established in March 2003, consisting the former Dahao and Hepu districts. Overlooking across the Queshi sea, there are Longhu District and Jinping District. Located on the coast of the South China Sea, Haojiang District has about 20 harbors. It has a population of 270,000.

External links
 Official website of Haojiang District Government

County-level divisions of Guangdong
Shantou
Island counties of China